John Haworth (8 May 1876 – 4 December 1924) was an English football manager. After playing amateur football as a youth, he was appointed manager of Accrington Stanley in 1897. He was in charge of the team for 13 years, leading them to two Lancashire Combination titles, before moving to nearby Burnley in July 1910. His 14-year spell as secretary-manager of Burnley was highly successful and guided the team to an FA Cup victory and a Football League championship. Haworth is the only Burnley manager to date to have won the FA Cup.

Personal life
Haworth was born in Accrington, Lancashire on 8 May 1876 and was the nephew of England international George Haworth. He died of pneumonia on 4 December 1924 aged 48.

Managerial career

Accrington Stanley
As a teenager, Haworth played amateur football for local club Meadow Bank, where he later became secretary. In 1897, he merged the club with North East Lancashire Combination side Accrington Stanley and became a member of the Accrington Stanley committee. Later the same year, he was named secretary of the club. At the time, club secretaries were in charge of first-team duties such as coaching and signing players. Under the stewardship of Howarth, Accrington Stanley were transformed into one of the foremost non-league clubs in Lancashire, winning the Lancashire Combination in the 1902–03 season. The following campaign, the team finished as runners-up before again claiming the league title in the 1905–06 season. He went on to manage the club for 13 years before leaving in the summer of 1910.

Burnley
Haworth was appointed secretary–manager of Football League Second Division side Burnley in July 1910, replacing Richard Wadge, who had taken care of first-team affairs since the death of Spen Whittaker in April 1910. During his first summer in charge, he signed Burnley's first foreign player, German defender Max Seeburg. Soon afterwards, he changed the colour of Burnley's strip as he considered the green kit to be unlucky. He opted to change the colours to claret and blue, to match the strip of reigning Football League champions Aston Villa. Towards the close of the 1910–11 season, Haworth pulled off his first major signing when he persuaded England centre forward Bert Freeman to join the club from Everton. The following season, Haworth guided the team to a third-placed finish in the Second Division, narrowly missing out on promotion. In the 1912–13 campaign, Burnley reached the semi-finals of the FA Cup before losing to Sunderland after a replay. That year, the team finished second in the league to gain promotion to the First Division.

In the club's first season in the top-flight of English football since 1900, he led the side to third place in the league, just three points off the title. He also guided the team to an unprecedented FA Cup run, where they conceded only four goals in eight matches. Haworth's team secured a 1–0 victory over Liverpool, making him the only manager to date to have won the FA Cup with Burnley. The team ended the 1914–15 season in fourth place in the First Division before football in England was interrupted for four years by the First World War. Upon the return to competitive football, Burnley finished runners-up in the league. The 1920–21 season started disappointingly for the side, but he eventually led the team to a 30-match unbeaten run to become Champions of England for the first time in 1921. A third-placed finish followed in 1922, but the team's league form fell away thereafter and they could only achieve relatively mediocre finishes in the next two campaigns. On 4 December 1924, he became the second successive Burnley manager to die while in office when he died of pneumonia.

Honours
Burnley
Football League champions: 1920–21
Football League runners-up: 1919–20
FA Cup winners: 1914

See also 
 List of English football championship winning managers

References

External links
John Haworth and Burnley Football Club

1876 births
1924 deaths
People from Accrington
English football managers
Accrington Stanley F.C. (1891) managers
Burnley F.C. managers